Fabrizio Macchi (born 26 July 1970) is a former Italian paralympic cyclist who won a bronze medal at the 2004 Summer Paralympics.

References

External links
 

1970 births
Living people
Paralympic cyclists of Italy
Paralympic bronze medalists for Italy
Medalists at the 2004 Summer Paralympics
Paralympic medalists in cycling
Cyclists at the 2004 Summer Paralympics